Franciszek Smuda (born 22 June 1948) is a Polish football coach and former footballer who also holds a German passport. As a player, he spent his career playing for clubs in Poland, the United States and Germany. In 1983, he turned to coaching, becoming the manager of Widzew Łódź, Wisła Kraków, Legia Warsaw and Lech Poznań, among others. He has won three Polish league titles. Since 2009 he was the manager of the Poland national team, but resigned on 16 June 2012, following their elimination from Euro 2012.

Early life 
Smuda was born in Lubomia, Wodzisław County, Poland, as a son of Gerard, a railway worker, and Marta.

Playing career 
As a player, Smuda played as a defender. He began his career at Unia Racibórz and later played for Odra Wodzisław Śląski. He got his debut in the Ekstraklasa playing for Stal Mielec during the 1970–71 season. He also played for Piast Gliwice, followed by a short spell at Vistula Garfield in the USA. He also participated in the NASL Hartford Bi-Centennials. In 1975 Smuda returned to Poland to play for Legia Warsaw. In 1978, he returned to the USA again to play for three other NASL clubs. He finished his career as a player in Germany then shortly after becoming a manager.

Coaching career 
Smuda began his coaching career successfully in the lower leagues in Germany. During the late 1980s, he was appointed as a manager in Turkey. He coached Altay Izmir and Konyaspor for a total of four years. In 1993, Smuda returned to Poland to help save Stal Mielec from relegation. During the seasons in Mielec, he managed to maintain the team in the Ekstraklasa.

Widzew Łódź 
In May 1995, Smuda was appointed as the manager of Widzew Łódź and finished in second place behind Legia Warsaw in the 1994–95 season. The following season, Smuda managed not losing a single game in the league. The 1995–96 season was another successful one with Widzew's Marek Koniarek scoring the most goals in the league at 29. Widzew qualified for the UEFA Champions League competition for the 1996–97 season. Smuda managed the team to eliminate the Danish champions, Brøndby IF and advanced to the Group Stage. Widzew were drawn into a group containing Atlético Madrid, Borussia Dortmund and Steaua Bucharest. Widzew finished the group in third place. The team from Łódź were able to repeat their feat of winning the Ekstraklasa again. The next season was not as promising as Widzew's management sold some of their key players and were eliminated in the qualifying phases of the Champions League. Widzew finished in 4th place that year and were unable to qualify for any European competitions. Shortly thereafter, Smuda moved to Wisła Kraków where he had much success.

Wisła Kraków 
Smuda was appointed as the manager of Wisła Kraków after the 1997–98 season. His goal was to build a team that would be not only be successful in Poland but also in European cups. Smuda won the Polish League the following season, however, Wisła was ejected from European tournaments due to a fan throwing a knife at Dino Baggio during a UEFA Cup match against Parma F.C. In September 1999, Smuda was dismissed as manager of Wisła after team's first defeat in the 1997–98 season.

Legia Warsaw 
After leaving Wisła in September 1999, Smuda was hired as manager of Legia Warsaw replacing Dariusz Kubicki. However, he did not win any trophies, nor qualify for any European competitions. After a 4–0 defeat by Zagłębie Lubin in March 2001, Smuda was sacked.

Return to Wisła Kraków 
In June 2001, Smuda was re-hired as a coach of Ekstraklasa champions Wisła Kraków. He failed to defeat FC Barcelona in the third qualifying round of the UEFA Champions League. After losing two league matches to Polonia Warsaw and Legia Warsaw in March 2002, he was replaced by Henryk Kasperczak.

Other clubs (2002–2004) 
Subsequently, Smuda managed Widzew Łódź, Piotrcovia Piotrków Trybunalski as well as the Cypriot team Omonia.

Odra Wodzisław 
Since 2004 he has been coaching Odra Wodzisław, it was a return to his homeland. Smuda successfully helped the side stave off relegation. A year later he finished third in the league with Zagłębie Lubin earning a spot in the UEFA Cup for the 2006–07 season.

Lech Poznań
In May 2006, Smuda was hired as the manager of Lech Poznań following the club's merger with Amica Wronki. He led the club to a sixth-place finish in the 2006–07 season and fourth the following season. He also qualified for 2008–09 UEFA Cup Round of 32 with Lech Poznań. In 2008–09 Ekstraklasa season, Lech Poznań managed to reach the top of the league table by the winter break, but a series of draws during the spring round resulted in a third-place finish at the end of the season. His contract with the club was not extended.

Zagłębie Lubin 
After several seasons with Lech Poznań, he returned to Zagłębie Lubin in September 2009.

Poland national team 
On 29 October 2009, Smuda was chosen as the new manager of the Poland national team. After a disappointing UEFA Euro 2012 tournament in which the Poland national football team finished last in their group below Russia, Greece & Czech Republic, Franciszek Smuda left his post as manager directly after the final defeat of the campaign.

Personal life 
Smuda is married to Małgorzata.

Honours

Managerial
Widzew Łódź
Ekstraklasa: 1995–96, 1996–97
Polish Super Cup: 1996
Ekstraklasa runner-up: 1994–95

Wisła Kraków
Ekstraklasa: 1998–99
Polish Super Cup: 2001

Zagłębie Lubin
Ekstraklasa bronze medal: 2005–06
Polish Cup runner-up: 2005–06

Lech Poznań
Polish Cup: 2008–09
Ekstraklasa bronze medal: 2008–09

References

External links
 NASL stats
 Franciszek Smuda at mackolik.com

1948 births
Living people
People from Wodzisław County
Sportspeople from Silesian Voivodeship
Polish footballers
Association football defenders
Odra Wodzisław Śląski players
Ruch Chorzów players
Stal Mielec players
Piast Gliwice players
Garfield Vistula players
Connecticut Bicentennials players
Legia Warsaw players
Los Angeles Aztecs players
Oakland Stompers players
San Jose Earthquakes (1974–1988) players
SpVgg Greuther Fürth players
North American Soccer League (1968–1984) players
Polish expatriate footballers
Expatriate footballers in Germany
Expatriate soccer players in the United States
Polish expatriate sportspeople in Germany
Polish expatriate sportspeople in the United States
Polish football managers
Altay S.K. managers
Konyaspor managers
Stal Mielec managers
Widzew Łódź managers
Wisła Kraków managers
Legia Warsaw managers
AC Omonia managers
Odra Wodzisław Śląski managers
Zagłębie Lubin managers
Lech Poznań managers
SSV Jahn Regensburg managers
Górnik Łęczna managers
Poland national football team managers
UEFA Euro 2012 managers
Ekstraklasa managers
I liga managers
II liga managers
Süper Lig managers
2. Bundesliga managers
Polish expatriate football managers
Expatriate football managers in Cyprus
Expatriate football managers in Germany
Expatriate football managers in Turkey